Well of Life may refer to:

 Fountain of Youth
 Fountain of Life
 Well of Life (sculpture), a work by Ivan Meštrović
 a saying of Solomon in the Book of Proverbs (wikisource)